USS Sheboygan (PF-57) was a  of the United States Navy which was later transferred to the Belgian Navy as Lieutenant ter zee Victor Billet.

Construction
Sheboygan was laid down on 17 April 1943, under a Maritime Commission contract by the Globe Shipbuilding Company at Superior, Wisconsin; sponsored by Mrs. Willard M. Sonnenburg; and placed in reduced commission at New Orleans, Louisiana, on 26 May 1944, with Lieutenant Commander A. J. Carpenter, USCG, in command. It is the only ship of the United States Navy to be named for Sheboygan, Wisconsin.

Service history
Ordered to Tampa, Florida, for conversion to a weather patrol ship, Sheboygan was decommissioned on 1 June. On 14 October 1944, she was recommissioned. Shakedown in Bermuda followed; and on 21 February, the frigate arrived at NS Argentia, Newfoundland, for weather patrol duty.

As a Navy ship, she performed weather and plane guard patrols in the North Atlantic, broken by periods of upkeep in Naval Station Argentia, and Boston, Massachusetts, until transferred to the United States Coast Guard on 14 March 1946. Her work in the North Atlantic, however, continued until she was decommissioned on 9 August 1946.

She was sold on 19 March 1947 to Belgium and served in the Belgian Navy as Luitenant ter zee Victor Billet until converted to a stationary training hulk in 1958, and was scrapped in 1959.

References

External links 
 
 hazegray.org: USS Sheboygan

Tacoma-class frigates
Ships built in Superior, Wisconsin
1943 ships
Sheboygan, Wisconsin
World War II frigates and destroyer escorts of the United States
Ships transferred from the United States Navy to the Belgian Navy
Lieutenant ter zee Victor Billet